Afrovivella is a monotypic genus of the succulent plant family Crassulaceae. The sole species is Afrovivella semiensis.

It has bright green leaves that are rimmed with conspicuous hairs. It was introduced once to the United States by Myron Kimnach in cultivation, until the plants were consumed by snails.

The species is found in the Semien Mountains of Ethiopia.

References

Bibliography

Crassulaceae
Crassulaceae genera
Monotypic Saxifragales genera
Taxa named by Alwin Berger